Pass Creek Pass, elevation , is a mountain pass along the border between Huerfano and Costilla counties in the southern part of the US state of Colorado. The pass marks the division between the Rio Grande and Arkansas River watersheds. Pass Creek flows generally north from the pass, merging with the Huerfano River near Gardner, Colorado. Sangre de Cristo Creek drains the south side of the pass.

Pass Creek Road traverses the pass. The Huerfano County section of the road is also called County Road 572. The road offers views of interesting geological features, including dikes and a section of the Dakota Formation.

References

Landforms of Huerfano County, Colorado
Landforms of Costilla County, Colorado
Mountain passes of Colorado
Transportation in Huerfano County, Colorado
Transportation in Costilla County, Colorado